The Sky Under the Heart is a 2012 Russian concert film of the rock band DDT directed by Victoria Kaskova.

Synopsis
The film contains the video record of the first concert of the rock programme Inache (Otherwise) as well as all the stages of the preparation of the show.

In Russia, the distribution of the film began on 5 April 2012. The distributor was a leader of art house movies in Russia, the company Movie Without Borders. The film is notable as the first example of multicamera concert filming in Russia and is the first Russian documentary film to be created without state financial support.

Sound direction was by the British studio Metropolis.

The film was produced by Yuri Burak and advertised by the Russian newspaper Novaya Gazeta which described the concert as the great music feature of the year.

Track list
 "Noise No.1"
 "" (For those born that night)
 "" (Sunlight)
 "" (Hey you, who are you)
 "" (Void)
 "" (Crisis)
 "" (Conductor)
 "" (Write to me, write)
 "" (Meeting)
 "Made in China"
 "" (They've come for you)
 "" (New Russia)
 "Noise No.2"
 "" (Song about time)
 "" (When you was here)
 "" (Song about freedom)
 "" (Southwestern Wind)

References

 RBC Daily (Russian)
 Novaya Gazeta (Russian)
 Nezavisimaya Gazeta (Russian)
 Echo of Moscow (Russian)
 

2012 films
2012 documentary films
Russian documentary films
2010s Russian-language films
Russian rock music